Aether, æther or ether may refer to:

Metaphysics and mythology
 Aether (classical element), the material supposed to fill the region of the universe above the terrestrial sphere 
 Aether (mythology), the personification of the "upper sky", space and heaven, in Greek mythology

Science and engineering
 Aether theories in physics
 Luminiferous aether, considered in late 19th century physics to be the medium through which light propagates
 Ether, a class of chemical compounds, or specifically:
 Diethyl ether, which has the common name "ether"
 Ether (cryptocurrency), created as part of the distributed computing platform Ethereum
 AETHER, an atmospheric radiative transfer algorithm
 Starting fluid

Arts and media

Gaming
 Aether (video game), a 2008 puzzle game
 Aether, a fictional planet, main setting for the 2004 video game Metroid Prime 2: Echoes
 Aether, a gatherable object in Aion (video game)
 Aether, a realm in Call of Duty: Zombies
 Aether (previously Æther), the cosmic substance that is channeled to perform magic as defined in the lore of Magic: The Gathering
 Aether, one of the first Minecraft mods to be made
 Aether, a unique skill only Ike can learn in Fire Emblem: Path of Radiance
 Rivals of Aether, a 2017 fighting game
 Ether, a recurring item in the Pokémon series
 Aether, a mutation of the Photon particle in the story for Episode 4 of the 2012 video game Phantasy Star Online 2
 Aether, the male protagonist in the 2020 video game Genshin Impact

Music
 Ether (Original Mix) - Grant Saxena [Ruckus Records 2017]

Artists
 Ether (band), Welsh rock band (1996–1999)
 Ether, US-based Australian rock group better known as Memento, disbanded 2007
 A lesser known visually impaired Canadian artist, Jason Taylor, goes by Aether. (2013-Now)
 Æther Realm American heavy metal band. (2010-Now)

Albums
 Æther Shanties, a 2009 album by Seattle Steampunk band Abney Park
 Aether (album), a 2001 album by Australian jazz trio The Necks
 Ether (Babble album), a 1996 album by British–New Zealand electronic dance music group Babble
 Ether (B.o.B album), a 2017 album by American rapper B.o.B.
 Ether (Fischer-Z album), a 2008 experimental music project by British rock group Fischer-Z, the creative product of British multimedia artist John Watts
 Ether Song, a 2003 album by British band Turin Brakes.

Songs
 "Ether" (song), a 2001 song by American rapper Nas
 "Aether", a song by Robin Hitchcock on his compilation album You & Oblivion
 "Ether", a 2016 single by heavy metal band Make Them Suffer
 "Ether", a song by Gang of Four on their album Entertainment!
 "Ether", a song by Arca from Kick IIIII

Other media
 Aether– the Reality Stone (Red Stone), a weapon and plot device in Marvel Cinematic Universe, first appeared in the film Thor: The Dark World

Other uses
 Ether (Book of Mormon prophet), a prophet from the Book of Mormon
 Ether, North Carolina

See also
 Aither (disambiguation)
 Aethyr (disambiguation)
 Ether
 Ethernet, a computer communications technology